Thomas Kevin Rees (born May 22, 1992) is an American football coach and former player, who is the current offensive coordinator of the Alabama Crimson Tide. He played college football at Notre Dame from 2010 to 2013.

Early years
Rees was born to Bill and Susan (née Cantwell) Rees in Los Angeles, California and grew up in Lake Bluff, Illinois. His father played college football at Ohio Wesleyan and served as an assistant coach at Northwestern and UCLA. Tommy played football at Lake Forest High School. As a senior in 2009, he completed 215 of 308 passes for 2,572 yards and 23 touchdowns while only throwing 3 interceptions the entire season. Rees had several explosive games including a 526-yard, six-touchdown performance against Bradford. His brother Danny Rees played football at UCLA.

Rees was rated a three-star recruit by ESPN and Rivals.com, and signed with the Notre Dame Fighting Irish in July 2009.

College career

2010 season
As a freshman at Notre Dame, Rees saw limited action in games against Michigan and Navy, before being forced into action early against Tulsa when starting quarterback Dayne Crist ruptured his patellar tendon. Rees finished the game with 334 yards and four touchdown passes, but threw a costly interception in the waning minutes of the game which sealed the victory for the Golden Hurricane. Rees led the Irish to victories in his first four starts at quarterback, including upsets of Utah and USC, culminating in a 33–17 victory over Miami in the Sun Bowl. He finished the season with 1106 yards passing, 12 touchdowns and 8 interceptions.

2011 season
In the 2011 season, Rees passed for 2,869 yards, 20 touchdowns, and 14 interceptions. Notre Dame went 8–4 in the regular season with a bowl loss. Andrew Hendrix and Everett Golson competed with Rees for the starting QB position in the 2012 season.

After Michigan's comeback in the September 10 rivalry game, the derisive nickname "Turnover Tommy" began to circulate, which stuck with Rees following his performance in 2011, and through his college career. Despite this reputation, Rees would finish the season with a completion percentage of 65.5%, a second to the Irish record of 68%, held by Jimmy Clausen. Rees' 14 interceptions this season was a tie for 11th in the FBS.

2012 season
Rees was suspended by head coach Brian Kelly  for the first game of the 2012 season after the junior quarterback was arrested and charged with resisting law enforcement and illegal consumption of alcohol by a minor after fleeing from an off-campus party.  Everett Golson was named the starter for the opening game against Navy in Dublin, Ireland. Golson played most of the second game of the 2012 season against Purdue but was injured leading Rees to come in. Rees entered the game to a cascade of boos yet exited after piloting the game-winning drive, which ended in a winning field goal for Notre Dame. However, after the game, Coach 
Brian Kelly indicated that the team was staying with their initial starter, Golson, for the third game of the 2012 season at Michigan State. Rees would go on to start two games that year as Notre Dame made the BCS title game.

2013 season
On June 5, 2013, it was announced Rees would start at quarterback for the 2013 season.

Career statistics

Professional career
After going undrafted in the 2014 NFL Draft, Rees was signed by the Washington Redskins on May 10, 2014. He was released by the team on May 17.

Coaching career
Rees began his coaching career at Northwestern, where he spent one season as an offensive graduate assistant for the 2015 team. On February 9, 2016, Rees joined the San Diego Chargers coaching staff as an offensive assistant.

In January 2017, Rees returned to Notre Dame to be the quarterbacks coach. On January 14, 2020, Rees was officially promoted to offensive coordinator, replacing Chip Long. In his first season as offensive coordinator, the Irish finished the 2020 campaign 10–2 with a loss to eventual national champion Alabama in the College Football Playoff semifinal.

On February 3, 2023, CBS reported that Rees had reached a deal with Alabama to become the offensive coordinator for the Crimson Tide.

Personal life
Rees' father, Bill, works for the University of Notre Dame. His mother's name is Susan. He has an older brother, Danny, who played football at UCLA and a sister named Meghan.

References

External links
 Notre Dame profile

1992 births
Living people
American football quarterbacks
Northwestern Wildcats football coaches
Notre Dame Fighting Irish football coaches
Notre Dame Fighting Irish football players
San Diego Chargers coaches
Washington Redskins players
People from Lake Bluff, Illinois
Coaches of American football from Illinois
Players of American football from Illinois
Players of American football from Los Angeles
Sports coaches from Los Angeles